Ljuboten is a village in the municipality of Butel, North Macedonia. It used to be part of  Čair Municipality.

Demographics
According to the 1467-68 Ottoman defter, Ljuboten appears as being inhabited by an Orthodox Albanian population. Some families had a mixed Slav-Albanian anthroponomy - usually a Slavic first name and an Albanian last name or last names with Albanian patronyms and Slavic suffixes. The names are: Dimitri the son of Toman, Todor his son, Nikola the brother of Dimitri, Ton-ça the son of Toça, Jovan the son of Gjergj, Petro the son of Gjergji, Nikola i son of Paltush (Palo-Tushi). 

According to the 2021 census, the village had a total of 2.688 inhabitants. 
Albanians 2.561
Macedonians 76
Romani 7
Serbs 1
Others 43

References

External links

Villages in Butel Municipality
Albanian communities in North Macedonia